Brugger or Brügger may refer to:

People 
Agnieszka Brugger (born 1985), German politician
Alois Brügger (1920–2001), Swiss neurologist who studied pain caused by bad posture
Arnold Brügger (1888–1975), Swiss painter
Christian Georg Brügger (1833–1899), Swiss botanist and naturalist
Christina Gilli-Brügger (born 1956), Swiss cross country skier
Ernst Brugger (1914–1998), Swiss politician and member of the Swiss Federal Council (1969–1978)
Frank Brugger (1927–2000), New Zealand businessman
Friedrich Brugger (1815–1870), German sculptor
Hazel Brugger (born 1993), Swiss-American comedian and television presenter
Janai Brugger (born 1983), American opera singer
Janosch Brugger (born 1997), German cross-country skier
Juergen Brugger, Swiss engineer
Karl Brugger (1941–1984), German foreign correspondent and author
Kenneth C. Brugger (1918–1998), naturalist
Kurt Brugger (born 1969), Italian luger
Mads Brügger (born 1972), Danish filmmaker and TV host
Marc Brügger, Swiss curler and coach
Mathias Brugger (born 1992), German track and field athlete
Michael Meier-Brügger (born 1948), Swiss linguist and Indo-Europeanist
Nathalie Brugger (born 1985), Swiss sailor
Peter Brugger (born 1972), singer of the band Sportfreunde Stiller
Remo Brügger (born 1960), Swiss footballer
Simon Brügger (bor 1975), Swiss sailor
Ulrich Brugger (born 1947), retired West German long-distance runner
Winfried Brugger (born 1950), Professor of Public Law, Philosophy of Law and Theory of State at Heidelberg University

Weapons 
Brügger & Thomet (B&T or B+T), licensed Swiss defense supplier
Brügger & Thomet APR (Advanced Precision Rifle), family of Swiss sniper rifles
Brügger & Thomet GL-06, stand-alone shoulder-firing non-lethal weapon for military and police applications
Brügger & Thomet MP9 (Machine Pistol 9mm), machine pistol
Brügger & Thomet VP9 (Veterinary Pistol 9mm), bolt action suppressed pistol

Aircraft 
Brügger Colibri and MB-3 Colibri, a family of small sports aircraft designed in Switzerland in the 1960s and 70s for amateur construction

See also
Bruegger's
Brøgger
Brügge
Prugger
Brüggen (disambiguation)